Spike, spikes, spiking, or spiky may refer to:

Arts, entertainment, and media

Books
 The Spike (novel), a novel by Arnaud de Borchgrave
 The Spike (book), a nonfiction book by Damien Broderick
 The Spike, a starship in Peter F. Hamilton's The Evolutionary Void

Comics
 Spike (DC Thomson) a British comics anthology published by DC Thomson
 Spike (IDW Publishing), a comic book series featuring the Buffy the Vampire Slayer character

Film and television
 Spike (2008 film), directed by Robert Beaucage
 Spike (dog), a dog actor
 Spike (TV channel), a former name of the American cable network Paramount Network
5Spike, a former localized British version of the American channel
 Spike (Australian TV channel), a localized version of the American channel
 Spike (Dutch TV channel), a localized version of the American channel
 "Spike!", a segment of the 2017 Thai TV series Project S: The Series

Music
 Spike (Agata album), 2004
 Spike (Puffy AmiYumi album), 2001
 Spike (Elvis Costello album), 1989
 Spike (music), a part of certain stringed instruments
 "Spikes", a song by Death Grips from the album Bottomless Pit
 "Spike", a song from The Network album Money Money 2020

Periodicals
 Spike Art Quarterly an art magazine based in Berlin and Vienna est. 2004
 Spike Magazine, an internet cultural journal which began in 1996

Other uses in arts, entertainment, and media
 Spike (character), a list of fictional characters named Spike
 Spike (company), a video game company
 Spike (journalism), to decide not to publish or publicize a story
 Spike (stagecraft), markings on a stage to show the correct positioning of objects and actors
 Spike (video game), a 1983 platform game for the Vectrex video game system

Biology and medicine
 Spike (botany), a kind of inflorescence in which sessile flowers are arranged on an unbranched elongated axis
 Spike (neuroscience), or action potential
 SPIKES, a clinical protocol used to break bad news to patients
 Spike protein, a structure projecting from the surface of an enveloped virus, which binds to host cells
 Spine (zoology), a hard, needle-like anatomical structure

People

Names
 Spike (nickname), a list of people
 Spike (surname), a list of people
 Spikes (surname), a list of people

People with the  name or stage name

In film
 Spike Jonze, an American filmmaker
 Spike Lee, an American filmmaker

In music
 Spike (musician), singer of The Quireboys
 Spike (Welsh guitarist), stage name of Mike Williams
 Spike, stage name of Frans van Zoest, guitar player of rock band Di-rect
 Spike Jones, American bandleader and humorist
 Spike Slawson, American punk vocalist and bassist of the Swinging Utters and Me First and the Gimme Gimmes
 Spike Xavier, lead singer of nu metal band Corporate Avenger

In professional wrestling
 Spike Dudley, the ring name of former American professional wrestler Matthew Jonathan Hyson (born 1970)
 Moondog Spike, the ring name of American professional wrestler Bill Smithson
 Spike Huber, a professional wrestler from the United States Wrestling Association
 Spike, a professional wrestler, half of the Gorgeous Ladies of Wrestling tag team The Heavy Metal Sisters

Sport

 Spike (gridiron football), a play in American football
 Spike (volleyball), a form of volleyball attack
 Spikes (mascot), the mascot of the Minor League AAA Rochester Red Wings
 State College Spikes, a minor league baseball team that plays in the New York – Penn League
 Track spikes, lightweight shoes with spikes screwed into their bottom, or spike plate, in order to maximize traction

Technology

Computing
 Spike (application), an email app which displays email in a chat-like format
 Spike (database), a biological database
 Spiking (fintech), a social trading platform
 Spike (software development), a small task done to reduce uncertainty about a larger task
 SPIKE algorithm, a mathematical parallel algorithm for solving banded systems of linear equations

Mechanical devices
 Cleat (shoe), a protrusion on the sole of a shoe to provide traction
 Track spikes, lightweight shoes with spikes screwed into their bottom, or spike plate
 Nail (fastener), or spike, especially one over ten inches (25 cm) long
 Rail spike, used to construct railroad tracks
 Screw spike, used to construct railroad tracks
 Spike strip, a device used to impede or stop the movement of wheeled vehicles
 Spindle (stationery), an upright spike used to hold papers

Other uses in technology
 Spike (missile) an Israeli fourth generation anti-tank guided missile (ATGM)
 Voltage spike, also called an electrical surge, an electronic glitch
 Spiking a gun, a method of rendering a cannon temporarily inoperable by driving a metal spike into the touch hole

Other uses
 Spike, to add alcohol or another recreational drug to a typically non-alcoholic drink or foodstuff
 Mickey Finn (drugs), a drink laced with an incapacitating drug
 Spike, a colloquial name for a workhouse
 Spike, Michigan, a former settlement
 Tree spiking, a radical environmentalist tactic

See also

 
 
 Spiked (disambiguation)
 Spiker (disambiguation)
 The Spike (disambiguation)
 Golden spike (disambiguation)
 Spike Island (disambiguation)